"After Apple-Picking" is a poem by American poet Robert Frost. It was published in 1914 in North of Boston, Frost's second poetry collection. The poem does not conform strictly to a particular form, though it is loosely iambic pentameter.

Summary
The poem describes a pastoral scene of New England life in autumn, characteristic of Frost's early work. The narrator is recalling his day spent picking apples on a ladder as he falls asleep. Scholarly interpretation of the poem often focuses on themes of sleep, dreaming, and the somber conclusion to the piece, in which the narrator wonders if his oncoming sleep is a normal slumber, or a "long sleep." The poem has 42 lines.

References

Robert Frost
Poetry by Robert Frost
Modernist poems
American poems
Poems
1914 poems